Grecești is a commune in Dolj County, Oltenia, Romania with a population of 2,038 people. It is composed of six villages: Bărboi, Busu, Busulețu, Grădiștea, Grecești and Gropanele.

References

Communes in Dolj County
Localities in Oltenia